During the 2003–04 Spanish football season, Valencia CF won the double of La Liga and the UEFA Cup. At the end of the season, manager Rafael Benítez left to manage English side Liverpool and was succeeded by former Chelsea, Fiorentina and Valencia manager Claudio Ranieri.

Valencia CF enjoyed a marvellous season by winning the La Liga and UEFA Cup double. The key players of the squad were Mista, Vicente Rodríguez, Francisco Rufete, David Albelda, Roberto Ayala, Fábio Aurélio, Amedeo Carboni and Mauricio Pellegrino. Valencia CF started the league well in the early season but slumped in the mid-season and later made a remarkable comeback (remontada) in April and May thanks to Real Madrid's several slips. Valencia CF were on course for their first-treble winning season, however, Valencia were eliminated by eventual Copa del Rey runners-up Real Madrid in the quarter-finals and thus denying them a season treble.

Overview

Squad
Squad at end of season

Transfers

Left club during season

Competitions

La Liga

League table

Results by round

Matches
All kickoff times are in CEST.

Copa del Rey

Quarterfinals

UEFA Cup

First round

Second round

Third round

Fourth round

Quarter-final

Semi-final

Final

Statistics

Players statistics

References

Valencia CF
Valencia CF seasons
Spanish football championship-winning seasons
UEFA Europa League-winning seasons